Leonard J. Bodack (August 10, 1932 – July 7, 2015) was an American politician.

Born in Pittsburgh, Pennsylvania, Bodack served in the United States Marine Corps during the Korean War. He attended Point Park College. Bodack lived in Lawrenceville, Pennsylvania. Bodack was involved in the Democratic Party. Bodack served in the Pennsylvania State Senate from 1979 to 2002.

Early life 
Bodack was born in Pittsburgh, Pennsylvania in 1932, the son of Joseph and Mary Bodack. He attended Pittsburgh Academy and Point Park College. He served in the Marines from 1950 to 1954 and was a veteran of the Korean War.

Career 
Bodack represented the 38th district in the Pennsylvania Senate from 1979 to 2002. From 1996 to 2002, he was chairman of the Allegheny County Democratic Party. During the 1990s, Bodack served as the Pennsylvania State Senate's Democratic whip.

Personal life 
Bodack was married to Shirley Wagner and they had six children. Bodack died on July 7, 2015.

References

External links
 - official PA Senate profile (archived)

2015 deaths
Democratic Party Pennsylvania state senators
1932 births
Point Park University alumni
Politicians from Pittsburgh
Military personnel from Pittsburgh
United States Marines
United States Marine Corps personnel of the Korean War